Christopher David Johnson (often credited as Chris "Yonko" Johnson) (born 25 January 1991) is a British television presenter and actor. He began presenting on the CBBC Channel in January 2010, and continued until April 2016. His first television appearance was for BBC Three, introducing Family Guy. Chris also makes content on YouTube under the user name OfficialCDJ.

He voiced Dennis the Menace for the 2013 series Dennis the Menace and Gnasher.

Johnson also has a podcast which he co-hosts called BigDamnCast. He also started up a podcast called Out of the Broom Cupboard (OOTBC for short) where he talks to previous and current presenters, actors, voice actors, puppeteers and more about their careers in and around CBBC. The name Out of the Broom Cupboard refers to the nickname given to the CBBC office due to the size.

Early life
He attended Moorside High School in Swinton from 2002 to 2007 where he performed in a number of school musical productions. He then attended Pendleton College from 2007 to 2009, studying Performing Arts and Film Studies. Whilst there, Chris played a part in several shows, taking on the title role in an adaptation of The Picture of Dorian Gray as one example, as well as being involved in the college's first comedy review show. Adaptations of his YouTube sketches appeared in the review as video gags.

In the summer of 2007, he took part in the 'League of Locals' event, a live sketch show organised by the members of The League of Gentlemen'''s then-official website, This Is A Local Shop.

From early 2008 to the end of 2009, Chris was the co-presenter of The Lewis Ryan Show on Salford City Radio. In August 2011 he made a return to the show, appearing most Saturdays and occasionally hosting the show himself when Lewis was unavailable. The duo retired the show in October 2013, preferring to concentrate more on their podcast work.

Career

BBC Three
During his time at Pendleton, he submitted a short introduction video to BBC Three as part of their Be On TV campaign. Performing an impression of Stewie Griffin from Family Guy, Chris's video proved successful enough upon airing to encourage BBC Three to require him once more in a relaunch of the campaign, this time providing a trailer showing others how to submit their own videos. The ad ran from April to August in 2009 on BBC Three.

CBBC
In January 2010, Chris began presenting links on the CBBC Channel, the last of which being Shout Out Saturday with Shannon Flynn. Prior to this he presented weekday afternoons with Hacker the Dog, and has been teamed previously with Dodge T. Dog, Ed Petrie or London Hughes. During school holidays, Chris presented the live mornings, and was also the voice of CBBC on BBC One & BBC Two. As of early 2010, he also became the chief presenter of CBBC's red button service CBBC Extra.

When the BBC moved children's services to MediaCityUK Chris was the first presenter to appear onscreen in the brand new CBBC Office set. As of January 2013, Chris became the chief continuity presenter on the CBBC Channel. He is sometimes referred to by the other presenters and sidekicks as 'Yonko', amongst other strange nicknames.

As part of the CBBC line-up, Chris has been involved with tie-in events such as Red Nose Day 2011 for Comic Relief. He has also made cameos on Sam & Mark's TMi Friday, Sam & Mark's Big Friday Wind-Up and in the fourth episode of the third series of Little Howard's Big Question alongside Hacker, as well as presenting in the second series of All Over The Place with his former partner Ed Petrie. In 2011 he partook in the Formula 1 CBBC Alternative Commentary as well as the Euro 2012 Final CBBC Alternative Commentary. Since 2014, Johnson has narrated Whoops I Missed the Bus.

On 4 July 2014 Johnson announced that he would be leaving the CBBC Office continuity links as of 5 September that year,. On the day itself it was announced that Chris would continue to appear as the recurring presenter for the Shout Out Saturday live slot.

Since 2016, Johnson has appeared on the CBBC panel show The Dog Ate My Homework a number of times across two series.

On 9 April 2016 Shout Out Saturday came to a close, and that morning Chris and Shannon Flynn announced it was their last ever day on the CBBC Channel continuity.

Dennis the Menace
Chris voiced Dennis the Menace from Season 2 onwards in the Dennis the Menace and Gnasher animated series, taking over from Sophie Aldred. The theme song was redone for the new version of the show, with Johnson providing vocals.

He also recorded a new series of 'Beanotown', as Dennis, for Fun Kids Radio, which was broadcast during the summer of 2013, with a second series broadcast in 2015. Chris provides the voice of Dennis and many other characters for most Beano tie-in projects, such as IOS games.

Doctor Who
Whilst working at CBBC, Chris took part in several Doctor Who & The Sarah Jane Adventures promotional events. As an open 'mega-fan' of both shows, he was the obvious choice for the sketches, which included a five-part crossover with the CBBC Office and the characters from The Sarah Jane Adventures, interviewing Amy Pond actress Karen Gillan for CBBC on the week of the launch of the new series of Doctor Who, and many other examples. He provided the voiceover for a CBBC exclusive trailer for the 2013 series.

In early 2011, Chris made his début as a member of the new Time Team feature for Doctor Who Magazine, and during that team's tenure they covered everything from the 2005 series' opener Rose, eventually ending unannounced in late 2017 with their piece about 2011's The Rebel Flesh/The Almost People. In 2018 the magazine relaunched the item with a different team, with no explanation given as to why the previous incarnation was concluded.

Chris also played several characters in the Doctor Who spin-off Gallifrey IV'' by Big Finish Productions, as well as appearing in the Bernice Summerfield story 'Private Enemy No.1' from the 'Epoch' series.

Chris appeared in the final episode of Doctor Who: The Adventure Games, 'The Gunpowder Plot', in the roles of 'Barnaby', plotter Robert Keyes and a royal guard.

In 2015, he appeared on the 'Doctor Who Comic Book Day' episode of Doctor Who: The Fan Show, as well as the review episode for The Magician's Apprentice.

Podcasting and other work
Not only does Chris host his 'OfficialCDJ' YouTube Channel, but he co-presented The Lewis Ryan Show most Saturdays on Salford City Radio. Chris appeared as one of the talking heads on Catalyst Media's "Temple of Nerd" Podcast, which ran for nearly two years before wrapping up in August 2014.

He appeared on an episode of Celebrity Mastermind in December 2012. In 2014 he appeared as 'Ken Kong' in an episode of Strange Hill High.

In 2014, he participated in several online audio series as a performer, including Timetunnel Media's 'Doctor Who: The Missing Adventures' as an Ice Warrior and in the role of companion Tim in the Aimless Wanderings audio plays.

To celebrate the ten year anniversary of the return of Doctor Who to television, Chris began a podcast series called '#9is10', which provides brand new episode commentaries for the entire 2005 run of the show, as well as extra interviews with guests, some of whom are personal friends. The entire run, which is ongoing from March 2015, can be downloaded for free from his 'OfficialCDJ' SoundCloud page.

A casual gamer, Chris began a Twitch streaming service in 2015 where he plays indie and mainstream titles for the PS4.

He collaborates often with the YouTube group FiveWhoFans, appearing in their videos from time to time. In August 2017, he became a main cast member.

His latest podcast, the '#BigDamnCast', is released weekly on iTunes.

Filmography

Television

Video Games

Audio Productions

Theatre and stage

Podcasts

References
5 Sep will be my last day in the CBBC Office. It's been amazing but after playing 'Chris' for 4 years it's time to try something new.

External links
 

1991 births
Living people
British television presenters
British male voice actors
People educated at Moorside High School
Male actors from Salford
Place of birth missing (living people)
21st-century English male actors